Sirajganj District  is a district in the North Bengal region of Bangladesh, located in the Rajshahi Division. It is an economically important district of Bangladesh. Sirajganj district is the 25th largest district by area and 9th largest district by population in Bangladesh. It is known as the gateway to North Bengal.

Its administrative headquarter is Sirajganj. It is famous for its hand-loom cottage industries. In 1885, Sirajganj emerged as a thana. Formally under Mymensingh District in Dacca Division, it was transferred to Pabna District on 15 February 1866. It was upgraded to become a subdivision of Pabna in 1885. In 1984, it was upgraded to a district.

History 
In 1762, a severe earthquake changed the flow of the Jamuna river and created a new river named Baral. On the west bank of this Baral river, new land emerged and most of the land of surrounding it belonged to Zamindar Siraj Ali Chowdhury. So, after his name gradually this area got its recognition as Sirajganj.

The historic Salanga Movement in 1922 led to 1200 deaths, most notably in a massacre of independence activists on 27 January 1922, referred to as the Salanga massacre in Bengali history and memorialized with "Salanga Day" annually. In 1924, a conference of All India Congress Party there. The convention of Brahmo Samaj in Sirajganj took place in 1928. In 1932, Kazi Nazrul Islam, currently known as the National Poet of Bangladesh visited Sirajganj. In 1940, the then Prime Minister of Bengal, A. K. Fazlul Huq laid the foundation stone of Sirajganj Government College. In 1942, a conference of All-India Muslim League there was attended by Muhammad Ali Jinnah.

Geography
Sirajganj District is the gateway to the North Bengal. It is bordered on the north by Bogra District and Natore District; on the west by Natore District and Pabna District; on the south by Pabna District and Manikganj District; on the east Manikganj District, Tangail District and Jamalpur District.

The main rivers are Jamuna, Baral, Ichamati, Karatoya, Phuljor and Hurasagor.

Demographics

According to the 2011 Bangladesh census, Sirajganj District had a population of 3,097,489, of which 1,551,368 were males and 1,546,121 females. Rural population was 2,660,912 (85.91%) while the urban population was 436,577 (14.09%). Sirajganj district had a literacy rate of 42.05% for the population 7 years and above: 45.11% for males and 39.00% for females.

Religion 

Muslims make up 95.19% of the population, while Hindus are 4.57% of the population. The Hindu population has remained relatively constant while the Muslim population has constantly increased. The remaining 0.24% people follow other religions, mainly Christianity and Sarnaism.

Language 
Most of the people of this district are Bengalis, nearly 99.16%. They speak a local dialect of Bengali called Sirajganji dialect. The remaining 0.84% people are tribals, mainly Oraon and Mahato. The tribal population is 19,772.

Economy 
Sirajganj District is economically one of the most important district of Bangladesh. It is known for its unique economic structure. Sirajganj District has its own identity of clothes. Half of entire Bangladesh's weaving industries are in only Sirajganj District. Sirajganj District's great communication system helps to grow the entire North Bengal and Bangladesh's economy. Almost all kinds of crops are cultivated in this district.

Points of interest

 Chalan Beel : Chalan Beel is a wetland in Bangladesh. It is a large inland depression, marshy in character, with rich flora and fauna. Forty-seven rivers and other waterways flow into the Chalan Beel. As silt builds up in the beel, its size is being reduced.
 Homestead of Behula
 Shiva Temple
 Maha Prabhu Temple
 Gopinath Bigraha
 Kalika Debi Bigraha
 Pratap Dighi
 Joysagar Dighi
 House of Suchitra Sen
 Sirajganj Road : Sirajganj Road is one of the most important crossroads of entire Bangladesh
 China Barrages : There are four barrages located near Sirajganj city which are also a part of Sirajganj economic zone.
 Sirajganj Hard point
 Jamuna Eco Park
 Tarash Palace
 Navaratna Temple :
 Katar Mahal Jamidar bari
 Rautara Jamidar bari
 Sannal Jamidar bari
 Elliott Bridge : A bridge located in the centre of the Sirajganj city.
 Makka Aoulia Mosque
 Shahjadpur Dargah Mosque
 Shahzadpur Kachharibari :
 Tomb of Khaja Yunus Ali Enaetpuri
 Tomb of Shamsuddin Tabrizi
 Tomb of Abdul Ali Baki Shah
 Tomb of Makhdum Shah Doula
 Jamuna Bridge : Also known as the Bangabandhu Bridge. It is 4.8 kilometers long and it has 50 pillars and 49 spans.
 House of Maulana Abdul Hamid Khan Bhasani
 House of Syed Ismail Hossain Siraji
 Rasel Park
 Milkvita
 Baghabari Riverport
 Megaighat Riverport

Administration

Sirajganj Sub-division was established in 1885 under Pabna district and it was turned into a district in 1984. Of the nine upazilas of the district Ullahpara is the largest and Kamarkhanda is the smallest.
Moreover, the district has six municipals, six Parliament seats, 82 unions and 2016 villages.

List of Upazilas

There are nine (9) Upazilas, namely :
 
 Sirajganj Sadar Upazila
 Kazipur Upazila
Ullahpara Upazila
 Shahjadpur Upazila
 Raiganj Upazila
Kamarkhanda Upazila
 Tarash Upazila
 Belkuchi Upazila
 Chauhali Upazila

Transport 
Sirajganj District's transportation system is very good. It has the most important highway and railway of Bangladesh which connects the entire North Bengal and a part of South Bengal with the rest of the country. It is very easy to travel through the district because of its great transport system. It has the 2nd largest bridge Jamuna Bridge and the largest railway bridge of Bangladesh. Sirajganj District is also famous for its River-ports.

Like many other districts in Bangladesh, Sirajganj is also a district with many rivers. The main bridges are Bangabandhu Multipurpose Bridge over the River Jamuna, Nalka Bridge Over the River Foljodre, Eliot Bridge etc.

Education
There are 3 medical colleges in the district, the public Shaheed M. Monsur Ali Medical College, established in 2014, the private North Bengal Medical College & Hospital, established in 2000, and the private Khwaja Yunus Ali Medical College & Hospital, established in 2005. They are respectively allowed to admit 65, 85, and 95 students annually.

There are 2 universities in the district, the public Rabindra University, established in 2017 and the private Khwaja Yunus Ali University, established in 2012.

There are 6 government colleges under National University in the district. They are Islamia Government College, Government Akbar Ali College, Sirajganj Government College,  Government Kazipur Mansur Ali College, Government Rashidazzoha Womens College, Government Shahjadpur College.

There are 3 government high schools in the district. They are B.L. Government Boys High School, Saleha Ishaque Government Girls High School and Kazipur A.M.U. Government Girls High School.

Notable people

 Abdul Hamid Khan Bhashani
 Abdur Rashid Tarkabagish
 Captain M. Monsur Ali
 Jadav Chandra Chakravarti
 Suchitra Sen
 Ismail Hossain Siraji
 Rajanikanta Sen
 Abdul Matin 
 Abdul Latif Mirza
 Mahadev Saha
 Rajendra Lahiri
 Makhdum Shah
 Haimanti Sukla
 Abdullah-Al-Muti
 Ishan Chandra Roy
 Bappi Lahiri
 Mohammad Najibar Rahman
 K G Mustafa
 Fateh Lohani
 Khwaja Yunus Ali
 Abu Hena Mustafa Kamal
 Fazle Lohani
 Shakila Zafar
 Mokbula Manzoor
 Hossain Toufique Imam
 Kamal Lohani
 Mohammed Nasim
 Tauquir Ahmed
 Zahid Hasan
 M.A.Matin
 Kanak Chapa
 Arifur Rahman
 Mohammad Barkatullah
 Samudra Gupta
 Abdul Mannan Talukder
 Mak Yuree
 Husna Banu Khanam
 Abdullah al Mahmood
 Gazi M M Amjad Hossain
 Iqbal Hasan Mahmud Tuku
 Ataur Rahman
 Mazharul Islam
 G.A.K. Lohani
 Syeda Issabela
 Amanul Haque
 Motahar Hossain Talukdar
 Kshitish Mohan Lahiri
 Sezan Mahmud
 Abdul Hai Sarker
 Imtiar Shamim
 Kabir Bin Anwar
 Uzzal
 Ibne Mizan
 Dewan Nazrul
 Ali Raj
 M. Rafiqul Islam
 Abdul Latif Mirza
 Malay Bhowmick
 Talukder Moniruzzaman
 Rumana Mahmood
 Abdul Latif Biswas
 Tanveer Imam
 Abdul Momin Talukdar
 Abu Hasan Shahriar
 Hashibur Rahman Swapon
 Manzur Quader
 Abdul Majid Mandal
 Mozammel Haque
 Mirza Muraduzzaman
 Kamruddin Ahia Khan Majlish
 M Akbar Ali
 Ishaque Hossain Talukder
 Ansar Ali Siddiqui
 Mohammad Selim
 Shahidullah Khan
 Md. Habibe Millat
 Mofiz Uddin Talukder
 Dabir Uddin Ahmed
 Rafiqul Islam Bakul
 Syed Hossain Mansur
 Choyon Islam
 Tanvir Shakil Joy
 Shahidul Islam Khan
 Amanul Haque
 Afiea Nusrat Barsha
 Akhi Khatun

Notes

References

 Bangladesh Population Census 2011.
 Bangladesh Bureau of Statistics.
 Cultural survey report of Sirajganj District 2007:
 Cultural survey report of Upazilas of Sirajganj District 2007.

External links

 Digital Sirajanj
 Sirajganj official website
 Khwaja Yunus Ali Medical College Sirajganj Bangladesh

 
Districts of Bangladesh